The 2012 NASCAR Sprint Cup Series was the 64th season of NASCAR professional stock car racing in the United States and the 41st modern-era Cup season. The season started on February 18, 2012, at Daytona International Speedway, with the Budweiser Shootout, followed by the Daytona 500 on February 27. The season continued with the Chase for the Sprint Cup beginning on September 16 at Chicagoland Speedway and concluded with the Ford EcoBoost 400 on November 18 at Homestead-Miami Speedway.

During the 2011 season, NASCAR announced the Sprint Cup Series would be changing to fuel injection from carburetors, which had been used since NASCAR's founding in 1949. Sprint Nextel announced at the 2011 Awards Ceremony that they had extended their sponsorship of the series until 2016. Roger Penske won the Owners' Championship, while Brad Keselowski won the Drivers' Championship at the final race of the season. Chevrolet won the Manufacturers' Championship with 249 points. Keselowski became the first Dodge driver to win the championship since Richard Petty in 1975; he was also the last Dodge driver to do so, as 2012 was the manufacturer's final year in the Cup series. It was the first time since 2004 that the championship was won by someone other than Tony Stewart or Jimmie Johnson. Despite starting his season late, Stephen Leicht was the 2012 NASCAR Rookie of the Year after beating Josh Wise.

2012 was the final season that the fifth-generation cars (also known as the Car of Tomorrow)–which debuted in the 2007 season–were used in competition; as the new Generation 6 cars were introduced for the 2013 season.

Teams and drivers

Complete schedule
There were 40 full-time teams in 2012.

 The No. 33 changed owners in April. Joe Falk acquired the assets and ownership and was listed as owner after Martinsville; however Childress still fielded the car in races which Austin Dillon competed in.

Limited schedule

Team changes
 Roush Fenway Racing supported only three Sprint Cup Series teams after sponsorship troubles led to the closure of the No. 6 team, then driven by David Ragan. The team ran the Daytona 500 with 2011 Nationwide Series champion Ricky Stenhouse Jr. and ran other races that depended on sponsorship.
 Richard Childress Racing also downsized to three teams. Their No. 33 entry ran the first six races, with Elliott Sadler running the Daytona 500, Brendan Gaughan running the next four, and Hermie Sadler running at Martinsville. After Martinsville, Virginia car dealer and LJ Racing owner Joe Falk acquired ownership of the #33.
 Germain Racing changed their manufacturer to Ford after being with Toyota in 2011.
The Racer's Group owner Kevin Buckler announced the closure of his NASCAR team TRG Motorsports on January 9, 2012.
Red Bull Racing Team officially closed in December 2011.
Turn One Racing and Go Green Racing announced plans to enter the Cup Series in 2012. Turn One had scheduled 8 to 10 races after the Daytona 500, while Go Green Racing fielded the No. 19 Ford for Tim Andrews with his father Paul as the crew chief for 10 races.
Robinson-Blakeney Racing fielded a Cup Series team for J. J. Yeley.
Turner Motorsports attempted to make its Cup Series debut at Daytona in July. The team fielded a No. 50 Chevrolet for veteran Bill Elliott sponsored by retail chain Walmart in celebration of the 50th anniversary of the chain's founding.
Stewart-Haas Racing and Tommy Baldwin Racing announced on January 31 that they had formed an alliance for the 2012 season. TBR transferred the owners points of its No. 36 car over to SHR's No. 10 team, ensuring Danica Patrick a spot in the Daytona 500. Furthermore, David Reutimann drove the No. 10 in the 26 races that Patrick does not drive in.
In February 2012, former Red Bull Racing Team director Thomas Ueberall purchased the owner's points of the No. 83 and No. 4 (later changed to 93). The team is known as BK Racing. Landon Cassill drove the No. 83 and Travis Kvapil drove the No. 93 at most of the races with David Reutimann piloting the car for the Daytona 500.
On February 13, 2012, Michael Waltrip Racing purchased the owner's points from FAS Lane Racing and transferred them to the No. 55 ride, which guaranteed Mark Martin a spot in the Daytona 500. FAS Lane later acquired the 2011 owner's points from the Roush Fenway Racing team's No. 6 ride.
Inception Motorsports acquired the owner's points of the dormant TRG Motorsports team, which finished 36th in 2011 Owners Championship.

Crew chief changes
On July 27, 2011, Hendrick Motorsports announced that Kenny Francis would join driver Kasey Kahne in 2012, continuing their partnership. Former crew chief Lance McGrew worked on developing the Chevrolet for the 2013 season.
Mike Ford, the crew chief for Denny Hamlin in 2011, was fired by Joe Gibbs Racing. He eventually took over Crew Chief Duties for Aric Almirola midway through the 2012 season
Former Penske Racing crew chief Steve Addington announced his hiring by Stewart-Haas Racing to be crew chief for Tony Stewart.
SHR crew chief Darian Grubb was informed of his post-season release by Tony Stewart prior to the 2011 Bank of America 500. He was later hired by Joe Gibbs Racing to crew chief for Denny Hamlin.
Hendrick Motorsports engineer Chris Heroy was signed as the crew chief for Juan Pablo Montoya.
Former Earnhardt Ganassi Racing crew chief Brian Pattie was hired by Michael Waltrip Racing to be crew chief for Clint Bowyer's No. 15 car.
Richard Childress Racing crew chiefs Gil Martin and Shane Wilson swapped cars for 2012, with Martin crew chiefing the No. 33 on a limited basis and Wilson moving to the 29 at Kevin Harvick's request.
After being released by Red Bull Racing Team after the 2011 season, Ryan Pemberton was the crew chief for Dave Blaney at Tommy Baldwin Racing after Philippe Lopez left the team for Richard Petty Motorsports' Nationwide Series team.

Driver changes

Changed teams
 Following the loss of one of his major sponsors, 2011 Richard Petty Motorsports driver A. J. Allmendinger moved to Penske Racing to drive the vacated No. 22 Dodge.
 Clint Bowyer changed teams for the 2012 season moving from Richard Childress Racing to Michael Waltrip Racing (MWR) where he drove the No. 15 5-hour Energy Toyota.
 Kurt Busch, whose 2011 season was marked by various behavior problems, mutually agreed with Roger Penske and sponsors Royal Dutch Shell and Pennzoil to be released from Penske Racing. Busch was later announced as the driver of the No. 51 Chevrolet run by Phoenix Racing.
 Kasey Kahne replaced Mark Martin in the Hendrick Motorsports No. 5 Chevrolet with Farmers Insurance Group sponsorship.
 Expressing the desire to run a limited schedule, Mark Martin joined MWR for 2012 for 25 races, driving the No. 55 Aaron's Toyota vacated by David Reutimann.
 David Reutimann, who drove for Michael Waltrip Racing in 2011,  signed a one-year contract to drive for Tommy Baldwin Racing and BK Racing.
 Former Roush Fenway Racing driver David Ragan signed to drive for Front Row Motorsports in the No. 34 Ford.
 Landon Cassill and Travis Kvapil signed to drive with BK Racing, a team that purchased the assets of the former Red Bull Racing Team.

Entered the series
 On November 4, 2011, it was announced that former IndyCar driver Danica Patrick would drive the  No. 10 GoDaddy.com Chevrolet for Stewart-Haas Racing for 10 races.
 On January 4, 2012, Richard Petty Motorsports announced that Aric Almirola would drive the team's 'iconic' No. 43 Ford after driving in the Nationwide Series in 2011.
 On February 15, Rick Ware Racing announced its partnership with Larry Gunselman's Max Q Motorsports to run 2011 Nationwide Series ROTY Timmy Hill in the No. 37 Ford. Mike Wallace attempted Daytona. Ware dissolved the partnership after Hill decided to return to the Nationwide Series. Max Q reformed in July 2012 with a technical agreement from Tommy Baldwin Racing.
 On January 20, 2012, Go Green Racing announced they would attempt at least 10 Sprint Cup Series races with Tim Andrews in the No. 19 Ford, with his father Paul Andrews, a longtime crew chief, leading the effort.

Exited the series
 After being released by TRG Motorsports following the 2011 season, 2011 Rookie of the Year winner Andy Lally returned to the Rolex Sports Car Series to drive for Magnus Racing in the GT category. TRG later suspended its Cup team.

Changes

Technology
On January 21, 2011, NASCAR announced that the Sprint Cup Series would change to electronic fuel injection from carburetors, which had been used since 1949, for the 2012 season. During the 2010 off-season, NASCAR had discussed doing the change during the 2011 season; however, in the January 21 announcements, Robin Pemberton stated, "We don't anticipate any points races this year, or races  with fuel injection. It'll be a year dedicated to finetuning and getting the process down, whether it be inspection or the team side of it, with building engines. That's going along quite well." Afterward, John Darby, NASCAR's managing director of competition, said he hoped to debut the electronic fuel injection engine at least in the second race of the 2012 season.

Communication
After the 2011 season ended, NASCAR decided to ban communication between the driver and spotter to other drivers. The change was initially made to break up two-car racing at restrictor plate tracks, which had received criticism from spectators, but was later announced that it would be banned at all the races.

Schedule
On September 28, 2011, the final calendar was released containing 36 races, with the addition of two exhibition races. The schedule also includes two Gatorade Duels, which are the qualifying races for the Daytona 500.

Calendar changes
For the 2012 season, NASCAR made a few changes to the schedule. One of which moved the first race of the season, the Daytona 500, a week later. Along with the delay of the Daytona 500, the races at Phoenix International Raceway and Las Vegas Motor Speedway were moved a week later. Third, Kansas Speedway's first race of the season was moved from June to April, while its second race became the sixth race of the Chase for the Sprint Cup, after switching race dates with Talladega Superspeedway's Good Sam Roadside Assistance 500. Along with schedule changes, race lengths at Pocono Raceway changed from 500 miles to 400 miles in both races. A couple more changes occurred in the regular season because Dover International Speedway's first race followed the Coca-Cola 600, as well as switching the race dates of the Aaron's 499 and Richmond International Raceway's first event. Also, Kentucky Speedway's race was before the Coke Zero 400 at Daytona International Speedway.

Pre-season
Pre-season testing began on January 12, 2012, with NASCAR Preseason Thunder at Daytona International Speedway in Daytona Beach, Florida. The tests lasted three days, with each having a morning and afternoon session. In the morning session on the first day, Jeff Gordon was quickest ahead of Paul Menard and Kurt Busch with a time of 46.687 seconds. The afternoon test session featured limited tandem drafting, and Kyle Busch and six other cars broke the 200 MPH mark. Defending champion Tony Stewart stated his excitement for returning to Daytona, "Our sport is unique obviously having our biggest race the first race of the year, but it's very fitting at the same time because this race, we have more time during the offseason to prepare for this race than we do the others. You bring cars here that you have the extra time to just make them that little bit nicer than you normally have time to do."

On the second day, Martin Truex Jr. was quickest in the morning session after posting a time of 43.962 seconds, while Kurt Busch was quickest in the afternoon with a time of 43.677. The final day of testing was led by Jeff Gordon who topped the charts. The final day focused on neutralizing the controversial two-car draft. The third day of testing focused on drafting, and Vice President of Competition Robin Pemberton was pleased with the progress drivers and teams had made. "The way the cars run in the draft, the way they can draft and do draft and what they do to get their cars running to their maximum potential. So far, we like what we've seen. It's been a good mix of what they can do in a larger pack and how close they can get for a limited time to push."

Season summary
The season began with the annual Budweiser Shootout. Multiple cautions stemming from tight pack racing whittled down the field to only a few cars. On the last lap, Kyle Busch used a slingshot move to pass defending champion Tony Stewart to win his first Shootout. In the Duels, defending champion Tony Stewart held off the field for his third Duel victory, while Roush Fenway Racing teammates Matt Kenseth and Greg Biffle dominated the second duel, with Kenseth prevailing. In the season opening Daytona 500, persistent showers on February 26 forced the race to be postponed to Monday for the first time in its 53-year history. Starting at night, the race would take its most dramatic turn when Juan Pablo Montoya, attempting to catch up with the field under caution, had a part failure on his car, which veered up the racetrack into a jet dryer, sparking a brief fire that forced a 2-hour red flag, causing the race to run into Tuesday (another first). After the flag was lifted, Kenseth held off teammate Biffle and Dale Earnhardt Jr. on a green-white-checkered finish to win his second Daytona 500 and capture Jack Roush's 300th victory in NASCAR. 

The next week in Phoenix, Kevin Harvick dominated the race, but Denny Hamlin grabbed the lead late, and held off Harvick for his first win of 2012. The next week in Las Vegas, Tony Stewart dominated the race once again and held off Jimmie Johnson on a late restart to grab his first win of 2012 and his first at Las Vegas. The first short track race was at Bristol, and Brad Keselowski dominated the race, leading 232 laps and rolling to his first win of the season. The following weekend in California, Kyle Busch led for 80 laps, but Tony Stewart stayed on track when the rain came on lap 124, and was declared the winner when the race was called on lap 129. The next race at Martinsville, Jeff Gordon dominated the race, leading 329 laps. However, a late crash caused by Clint Bowyer and Jimmie Johnson set up a green-white-checkered finish, enabling Ryan Newman to take the lead and hold of A. J. Allmendinger for the win.

After an off-week, the teams returned to action at Texas. There, Greg Biffle held off Jimmie Johnson and grabbed his first win in 49 races. The next week at Kansas, Denny Hamlin held off a dominant Martin Truex Jr. to take his second win of 2012 under Darian Grubb. At Richmond, Carl Edwards dominated the race before a black flag on the restart knocked him out of contention. Tony Stewart held the point, but got caught up by a faulty final stop. Kyle Busch then inherited the lead to take his first win of 2012 and his fourth consecutive spring Richmond win. The series traveled to Talladega for its second superspeedway race of the year. After a flurry of late race cautions took out a number of contenders, Brad Keselowski, with help from Kyle Busch, drove past Daytona 500 winner Matt Kenseth and Greg Biffle to take his second win of 2012. At the Southern 500, Jimmie Johnson dominated the field, but stayed on track during the final round of pit stops on the advice of Chad Knaus and held off Denny Hamlin for his first win of 2012 and Rick Hendrick's 200th victory. At the Sprint All-Star Race, Dale Earnhardt Jr. and A. J. Allmendinger raced into the main event via finishing 1–2 in the Sprint Showdown, while veteran Bobby Labonte won the fan vote to transfer in. A slow restart after the fourth segment by Matt Kenseth allowed Jimmie Johnson to cruise to his third All-Star win. The following was NASCAR's longest race, the Coke 600. Greg Biffle once again had the dominant intermediate car, but Kasey Kahne drove past Denny Hamlin and teammate Dale Earnhardt Jr. on the final restart to take his first win of 2012 with Hendrick Motorsports.

The series moved to Dover, where Jimmie Johnson dominated the field and cruised to his second win of the year. At the repaved Pocono, polesitter Joey Logano pulled a bump and run on former mentor Mark Martin to score his first win since 2009. At a repaved Michigan, drivers had to contend with a new tire as well as a pre-race shower. Once the race got underway, Dale Earnhardt Jr. dominated the race, leading 95 laps en route to his first victory in 143 races. At Sonoma, Clint Bowyer dominated the race, leading 71 laps and holding off Tony Stewart and Kurt Busch on a green-white-checkered finish to win his first race with Michael Waltrip Racing. In the series return to Kentucky, Kyle Busch dominated the early stages of the race until a broken shock took him out of contention. A late crash by Ryan Newman set up a fuel mileage race, and Brad Keselowski took the lead and preserved enough fuel for his third win of the year. On the return trip to Daytona, the Roush duo of Matt Kenseth and Greg Biffle dominated the race. A late push from Kasey Kahne handed Tony Stewart the lead as well as his fourth Daytona victory. The next stop was Loudon, where Denny Hamlin dominated the race, leading 150 laps. However, a decision to take four tires on a final stop dropped him to 13th. Kasey Kahne held the lead on the final restart and held off a surging Hamlin for his second win of 2012.

After a week off, the Cup Series returned to action at the famed Brickyard. Denny Hamlin dominated the initial stages of the race, but lost the lead to Jimmie Johnson after a cycle of green flag pit stops on lap 30. From there, Johnson took over the lead and easily held off Kyle Busch for his 4th Brickyard victory. Moving for its return trip to Pocono, rain plagued the race all day, wreaking havoc on championship contenders. However, Jeff Gordon moved through a late wreck to shake off the bad luck and take his first win of the year; the race was called after 98 laps due to a second rainstorm that hit the circuit after earlier rain had delayed the start. The Cup Series made its final road course stop of the season at Watkins Glen. In a repeat of last year's race, Kyle Busch, Brad Keselowski and Marcos Ambrose dominated the day, but Busch, appearing on his way to a second win, spun in the esses with 2 laps to go, while Ambrose pulled a bump and run on Keselowski in turn 9, holding him off for the win. The drivers returned to Michigan, where polesitter Mark Martin dominated the early stages of the race until he was involved in a wreck with Kasey Kahne. Jimmie Johnson took the lead in the late stages of the race until his engine blew on lap 195, setting up a green-white-checkered finish. Greg Biffle took the lead and held off Brad Keselowski and Kasey Kahne for his second win of 2012.

Heading to a newly configured Bristol, Joey Logano dominated the early stages of the race, leading 139 laps. The lead changed hands multiple times as pit strategy dictated the nature of the race. Carl Edwards in need of a victory, stayed out after a caution involving polesitter Casey Mears. However, he dropped through the pack, handing the lead over to Denny Hamlin, who held off Jimmie Johnson for his third win of the season. At Atlanta, the battle up front was contested between Kevin Harvick and Denny Hamlin. However, Martin Truex Jr. got out front until a late crash by Jamie McMurray brought the field down pit road, and Hamlin exiting first. Hamlin then held off Jeff Gordon on a green-white-checkered for a series high 4th win of the season. At the final regular season race at Richmond, the wild card contenders attempted to get into victory lane to make the Chase field. Denny Hamlin dominated the first half of the race, leading 202 laps. However, a caution for rain on lap 276 shuffled the running order significantly. Clint Bowyer inherited the lead on lap 312, stretching his fuel mileage and holding off Jeff Gordon for his second win of the season. Gordon, despite falling a lap down early on, rallied to leapfrog Kyle Busch for the second wild card position in the Chase.

The Chase for the Sprint Cup kicked off at Chicagoland Speedway. Polesitter Jimmie Johnson dominated the race, leading 172 laps. However, Brad Keselowski got ahead of Johnson after the final round of pit stops, enabling Keselowski to pull away and score his fourth win of the season. At Loudon, Denny Hamlin backed up a promise he made on Twitter (later stating it was overblown) to win the race, and led 193 laps despite starting 32nd to take his fifth win of the season. The following week at Dover, the JGR duo of Kyle Busch and Denny Hamlin dominated the race. However, a lack of cautions in the race set up a fuel mileage race, forcing the duo to pit. June winner Jimmie Johnson attempted to take advantage, only to be forced to conserve fuel. Brad Keselowski inherited the point and managed to stretch his fuel to take his 5th win of the year as well as the points lead. The teams returned to Talladega, where a lack of cautions produced differing pit strategies between the teams. At the end, the race was about to come down to fuel mileage when leader Jamie McMurray spun with 6 to go. Matt Kenseth stayed out on track and stayed in front of the field when "The Big One" erupted, handing him his second win of 2012.

The Chase reached the halfway mark at Charlotte. Points leader Brad Keselowski dominated the race, looking to pad his points lead. However, Keselowski pitted one lap too late on his final stop and ran out of fuel on pit road, dashing his hopes for a win. Clint Bowyer, who pitted on lap 278, stretched his fuel mileage and held off Denny Hamlin for his third win of the season to tighten the points race. The series returned to Kansas, where a recent repave turned the race into a war of attrition. Matt Kenseth stayed out during the final caution and ran away from the field to pick up his third win of the season. The series headed back to Martinsville, where polesitter Jimmie Johnson dominated the race, capturing his 4th win of the season. At Texas, Johnson once again dominated from pole and held off a late charge from championship contender Brad Keselowski to take his second win in a row. The penultimate race at Phoenix was dominated by Kyle Busch. However, the championship race took a significant turn when points leader Johnson crashed out of the race. Bowyer who was third in the point standings was also knocked out of the championship contention after being intentionally wrecked by Jeff Gordon on lap 311. At the end of the race, winless Kevin Harvick would take the lead and capture his first win in 44 races. At the season finale in Homestead, the race once again came down to fuel mileage. Jimmie Johnson attempted to make the race on one less stop than his competitors, but was knocked out of contention for the win and the Championship when the drive train failed. Teammate Jeff Gordon took the point on lap 254 and used Johnson's strategy to take his first win at Homestead, while points leader Brad Keselowski finished 15th to secure his and Roger Penske's first Sprint Cup Championship.

Results and standings

Races

Drivers

(key) Bold – Pole position awarded by time. Italics – Pole position set by final practice results. * – Most laps led.

1 – Post entry, driver and owner did not score points.
2 – Hill and Cook started the season running for Cup series points but switched to Nationwide after California (Hill) and Watkins Glen (Cook).

Manufacturer

See also

 2012 NASCAR Nationwide Series
 2012 NASCAR Camping World Truck Series
 2012 NASCAR K&N Pro Series East
 2012 ARCA Racing Series
 2012 NASCAR Canadian Tire Series
 2012 NASCAR Toyota Series
 2012 NASCAR Stock V6 Series
 2012 Racecar Euro Series

References

 
NASCAR Cup Series seasons